Peter Evans was a British journalist who wrote for the Daily Express, and also wrote several unauthorized biographies of public figures including Aristotle Onassis and the Kennedy family. He died, age 78, in 2012.

Publications 
 Nemesis: The True Story of Aristotle Onassis, Jackie O, and the Love Triangle That Brought Down the Kennedys (2004) (ReganBooks)
 Ari: The Life and Times of Aristotle Socrates Onassis
 Ava Gardner: The Secret Conversations (2013)
 The Mask Behind the Mask, a Life of Peter Sellers
 Goodbye Baby & Amen
 The Englishman's Daughter
 Titles
 Behind Palace Doors (with Nigel Dempster)

References

British biographers
British journalists
2012 deaths